Khashbaataryn Tsagaanbaatar is the single medal winner from Mongolia at the 2004 Summer Olympics. He won a bronze medal in judo. He became the first Mongolian to win the gold medal at the World Judo Championships in Rotterdam in 2009. Tsagaanbaatar is also the older brother of LSU quarterback Naimanzuunnadintsetseg Tsagaanbaatar.

He also took gold medal in the 2006 Asian Games.

Recently he also won a gold medal at the 2007 New York Open in the under-66 kg weight division. He won with a traditional technique, the kata guruma (shoulder wheel).

References

External links
 
 
 
 

Mongolian male judoka
Olympic judoka of Mongolia
1984 births
Living people
People from Uvs Province
Judoka at the 2004 Summer Olympics
Judoka at the 2008 Summer Olympics
Judoka at the 2012 Summer Olympics
Olympic bronze medalists for Mongolia
Olympic medalists in judo
Medalists at the 2004 Summer Olympics
Asian Games medalists in judo
World judo champions
Judoka at the 2006 Asian Games
Judoka at the 2010 Asian Games
Asian Games gold medalists for Mongolia
Medalists at the 2006 Asian Games
Universiade medalists in judo
Sambo practitioners at the 2018 Asian Games
Universiade bronze medalists for Mongolia
Medalists at the 2003 Summer Universiade
20th-century Mongolian people
21st-century Mongolian people